Me'en may refer to:

 The Me'en language, a Surmic language of east Africa;
 The Me'en people, a Surma people of east Africa;